Lekshmi Gopinathan is an Indian author.

Her first novel was published in July 2017.

Lekshmi works as an art conservationist, an art tour manager, and a social entrepreneur.

References 

Indian travel writers
Indian business executives
Women business executives
Indian women novelists
Indian social entrepreneurs
Year of birth missing (living people)
Living people